Zakari is both a given name and a surname. Notable people with the name include:

Zakari Gourouza (born 1982), Nigerien judoka
Zakari Lambo (born 1976), Nigerien footballer
Zakari Morou (born 1991), Togolese footballer
Zakari Nandja, Togolese politician
Aziz Zakari (born 1976), Ghanaian athlete
Danladi Mohammed Zakari, Nigerian general

See also
Haliru Zakari Jikantoro, Nigerian politician